How to Murder Your Wife is a 1965 American black comedy film from United Artists, produced by George Axelrod, directed by Richard Quine, that stars Jack Lemmon and Virna Lisi. Quine also directed Lemmon in My Sister Eileen, It Happened to Jane, Operation Mad Ball, The Notorious Landlady, and Bell, Book and Candle.

The comic strip art featured in the film was credited to Mel Keefer, who drew newspaper comic strips such as Perry Mason, Mac Divot and Rick O'Shay. Comics artist Alex Toth did a teaser comic strip in Keefer's style that ran in The Hollywood Reporter and in several newspapers promoting the film for ten days prior to its theatrical opening.

Plot

Stanley Ford is a very successful newspaper cartoonist enjoying his bachelorhood in his New York City town house, with his loyal and attentive valet, Charles Firbank. Stanley's widely syndicated comic strip, Bash Brannigan, is a secret-agent thriller, and Stanley insists Brannigan will not be shown doing anything which Stanley himself has not actually done, which he ensures by enacting storylines, playing Brannigan, while Charles takes photographs which Stanley uses as visual references when drawing the comic strip.

While attending a bachelor party for his friend Tobey Rawlins, Stanley becomes very drunk and somehow ends up marrying the beautiful Italian woman who appears out of a cake, with an equally drunken judge performing the impromptu wedding. The following morning, Stanley wakes up and, even as he gazes at his naked wife sprawled on the bed, bitterly regrets it. Charles is told and storms off to start packing, as he refuses on principle to work for married couples. Stanley's attempt to discuss the situation with his new wife are frustrated when it emerges that she does not speak English. His lawyer, Harold Lampson, advises him that a divorce is not possible without legal justification.

Stanley's new bride is cheerful, affectionate, sexy, and a wonderful cook, but speaks only Italian. To learn English, she spends time with Harold's manipulative, hen-pecking wife Edna, who speaks fluent Italian, but she also learns Edna's manipulative ways. Charles leaves, taking a new job with the jilted Rawlins. Stanley now finds his bathroom filled with beauty products and lingerie, and he is kept awake at night by his wife constantly watching television, which she says helps with her English. She keeps a yapping little dog, her Italian cooking causes his weight to increase, and she announces that her mother will be coming from Rome to live with them.

Working at home, Stanley becomes increasingly irritated by the constant presence of his wife, and he changes his Bash Brannigan newspaper strip from the exploits of a daring secret agent to a domestic household comedy, The Brannigans, but it remains wildly popular. In a bid for some privacy, Stanley calls a meeting of his associates at his all-male health club. When Edna learns of the meeting, she telephones Mrs. Ford and arouses her suspicions about Stanley's activities. Mrs. Ford sneaks into the club to confront her husband, resulting in Stanley being banned for violating its "no women" policy.

Stanley concocts a plot in his comic strip for Brannigan to kill his wife by drugging her and disposing of her body in concrete on the construction site next to his townhouse, so that Brannigan can resume his career as a secret agent. As always, he enacts the events live before drawing the strip, drugging his wife during a party, but using a department-store mannequin to play out her burial in the goop from the gloppitta-gloppitta machine.

Next morning, Mrs. Ford comes to, sees the finished comic strip describing Stanley's murder plan and, while Stanley sleeps, she leaves, taking only her dog. After publication of the comic strip in the newspapers and with Mrs. Ford having disappeared without explanation, Stanley is arrested and charged with murder, with his comic strips used as prosecution evidence at the trial. When it appears that a conviction is likely, Stanley takes up his own defense and pleads justifiable homicide, appealing to the all-male jury's frustrations regarding their own wives and marriages. He is acquitted unanimously, and the men in the courtroom applaud wildly and carry Stanley out on their shoulders.

Accompanied by a joyful Charles, Stanley goes home and sees traces that his wife has returned and is in their bedroom. Charles reminds him that killing her now would not have any legal consequences, since Stanley has been acquitted of her murder and trying him again would constitute double jeopardy. However, when he enters their bedroom, he finds her naked under the covers, and she silently invites him to join her, which he does. Charles enters what used to be his bedroom and finds Mrs. Ford's mother who has arrived with her daughter and is unpacking. Like Charles, she has a prominent tooth gap, and there is instant chemistry between them. Looking through the fourth wall, Charles closes the door ...

Cast

Awards
 Jack Lemmon won the Golden Laurel for Male Comedy Performance at the Laurel Awards.
 Claire Trevor was nominated for Golden Laurel for Female Supporting Performance.
 Jack Lemmon was also nominated for BAFTA Film Award for Best Foreign Actor.

Soundtrack
The music was composed by Neal Hefti.

Reception
The film holds a 64% "Certified Fresh" rating on Rotten Tomatoes based on 14 reviews,  with an average rating of 6.2 out of 10. Variety states “Finesse and desire aren't enough to overcome the fact that Axelrod's script doesn't make the most of its potentially antic situations.” Bosley Crowther of the New York Times’s opinion was that “Never have I seen a movie, serious, comic or otherwise, that so frankly, deliberately and grossly belittled and ridiculed wives” and “this stuff is funny just so long as one can go with the sour joke- -and that depends upon one's tolerance of trivia and also, perhaps, upon whether one is a fellow or a girl.”

Cultural references
 The film is referenced in Fawlty Towers in the episode "The Wedding Party". Basil Fawlty says, “yes, awfully good, I saw it six times”. In the Italian version of the film, both Stanley's wife and mother-in-law are Greek.

See also
 List of American films of 1965

References

External links
 
 
 
 
 
 Mel Keefer
 voir films at the filmstreaming

1965 films
1960s black comedy films
1960s English-language films
1965 comedy films
American black comedy films
Films about comics
Films about fictional painters
Films directed by Richard Quine
Films produced by Gordon Carroll
Films scored by Neal Hefti
Films set in New York City
Films with screenplays by George Axelrod
United Artists films
1960s American films